Cogger is a surname. Notable people with the surname include:
Gerald Cogger (born 1933), English cricketer
Harold Cogger, Australian herpetologist
Jack Cogger, Australian professional rugby league footballer, son of Trevor
Michel Cogger, Québécois businessman, lawyer and former Canadian Senator
Trevor Cogger, Australian professional rugby league footballer, father of Jack

See also
Coger, another surname